EVRAZ plc is a UK-incorporated multinational steel manufacturing and mining company part-owned by Russian oligarchs. It has operations mainly in Russia as well as the USA, Canada, and Kazakhstan. As of 2015, the ultimate beneficial owners were Russian oligarchs Roman Abramovich (31.03%), chairman Alexander Abramov (21.59%) and CEO Aleksandr Frolov (10.78%) with the remaining 36.6% shares owned by other shareholders.

History
The company was founded as a small metal-trading business in 1992. On 2 June 2005 Evraz Group floated some 8.3 percent of its shares in the form of GDR in London. The company was priced at $14.50 per GDR implying an equity value of $5.15 billion. An additional 6% stake was placed in January 2006, resulting in a total free-float of 14.3%.

The company acquired Claymont Steel from H.I.G. Capital in 2008 for  million. The mill was closed in December 2013.

Sanctions
In the aftermath of the 2022 Russian invasion of Ukraine, the British government accused the company of "providing financial services or making available funds, economic resources, goods or technology that could contribute to destabilising Ukraine." After sanctions were applied to Abramovich, owner of 29% of the company, the Financial Conduct Authority suspended the trading of Evraz shares on the London Stock Exchange. The non-executive members of the board subsequently resigned.

On 10 August 2022, Reuters reported that Evraz was seeking to sell its North American units.

Operations
Evraz sets aside its coal business by the end of the year 2021 on the premise of all needed approvals, according to the group's report of the 1st half of 2021. In the very beginning of 2021 EVRAZ announced expecting to spin off its coal division consolidated in Raspadskaya. In April 2021, the group's board of directors approved the demerger of its coal assets to be shared pro rata among Evraz shareholders. In January 2022, Evraz shareholders also approved the demerger of the group's coal business, consolidated at PJSC "Raspadskaya" after the final decision made by the board of directors of Evraz last December.

The business structure is as follows:

Steel
Nizhny Tagil Iron and Steel Plant – NTMK – in Nizhny Tagil; major steel and vanadium slag producer
Novokuznetsk Iron and Steel Plant – NKMK in Novokuznetsk; major steel producer; leading in railway steel (merged with EVRAZ ZSMK)
EVRAZ Consolidated West-Siberian Metallurgical Plant (EVRAZ ZSMK) large steel producer in Siberia; merged with EVRAZ NKMK in 2011 (http://www.mbdatabase.com/Basic-Information/EVRAZ-ZSMK-Consolidated-West-Siberian-Metallurgical-Plant/20264/1)
EVRAZ North America  leading steel manufacturer built on the pedigree of successful steel companies – formerly known as Oregon Steel Mills, Rocky Mountain Steel and IPSCO. The company is headquartered in Chicago, Ill., and its six manufacturing facilities are located in Portland, Oregon; Regina, Saskatchewan; Pueblo, Colorado; Calgary, Camrose and Red Deer, Alberta.Ore
Evrazruda mining and enrichment facilities in Kemerovo Oblast In the Kemerovo Oblast: Tashtagol Mine, Kaz Mine, Sheregesh Mine, Gurev Mine, Abagur Sinter and Enrichment Plant
Kachkanarsky Ore Mining and Processing Enterprise – Vanady – KGOK pit mining in Sverdlovsk region;Sukha Balka Mines, Kryvyi Rih, Ukraine.Coal
Yuzhkuzbassugol coking coal mining in the Kuzbass RegionRaspadskaya/ coking coal company with three mines and one open pit in Mezhdurechensk, Kemerovo region, EVRAZ owns 82% of RaspadskayaVanadium
EVRAZ Vanady Tula
EVRAZ Nikom
EVRAZ East Metals AG

Sales and logistics
Metallenergofinance MEF, supplying electricity and heat for Evraz facilitiesNakhodka Commercial Sea Port in the Russian Far East, handling most of Evraz' exportsTrading House EvrazHolding/TH EvrazHolding working in domestic salesTrading House EvrazResource/TH EvrazResource working in domestic sales''

Corporate structure
The company's interests in the majority of its subsidiaries are held indirectly through its ownership of Mastercroft. In June 2006, Evraz Group announced a transaction that resulted in the transfer to Greenlease International Holding of a 50% interest in Lanebrook Ltd., an entity controlled by the principal shareholders of Evraz Group. As of April 2015 Lanebrook Ltd. held 63.70% of the company's shares, with the ultimate beneficial owners being Roman Abramovich (31.03%), chairman Alexander Abramov (21.59%) and CEO Aleksandr Frolov (10.78%).

Carbon footprint
Evraz reported Total CO2e emissions (Direct + Indirect) for 31 December 2020 at 43,620 Kt (+280/+0.6% y-o-y).

See also
List of steel producers

References

External links
Official Website

 
Steel companies of Russia
Mining companies of Russia
Iron ore mining companies of the United Kingdom
Companies based in the City of London
Companies listed on the London Stock Exchange
Roman Abramovich